Carlos Manuel Lobo Pires Semedo (born 1 September 1994) known as Ká Semedo, is a Cape Verdean footballer who plays for SC São João Ver as a forward.

Football career
On 11 April 2015, Ká Semedo made his professional debut with Vitória Guimarães B in a 2014–15 Segunda Liga match against Tondela.

References

External links

Stats and profile at LPFP 

1994 births
Living people
Cape Verdean footballers
Association football forwards
Sporting Clube da Praia players
Vitória S.C. B players
AD Oliveirense players
Sertanense F.C. players
A.D. Sanjoanense players
SC São João de Ver players
Santiago South Premier Division players
Cape Verdean National Championships players
Liga Portugal 2 players
Campeonato de Portugal (league) players